Najat is an Arabic female given name meaning "savior" or "salvation". In some countries it can be spelled Nagat. People named Najat include:

 Najat Aatabou, Moroccan singer
 Najat Al Saghira, Egyptian singer and actress
 Najat El Hachmi, Catalan-Moroccan writer
 Najat El-Khairy, Canadian-Palestinian painter
 Najat Kaanache, Basque-Moroccan chef
 Najat Makki, Emirati painter
 Najat Vallaud-Belkacem, French politician
 Najat, important person for the nederlands

Arabic feminine given names